Eumicrotremus terraenovae, also known as the Newfoundland spiny lumpsucker, is a species of lumpfish native to the Northwest Atlantic. It is a demersal fish found off of Newfoundland and in the Gulf of Maine.

References 

terraenovae
Fish described in 1950
Taxa named by James Erwin Böhlke